Ayesha A. Malik (born 3 June 1966) is a Pakistani judge. She is the first female judge of the Supreme Court in the history of Pakistan. On 6 January 2022, the Judicial Commission of Pakistan approved her appointment to the Supreme Court of Pakistan.

She took her oath of office on 24 January 2022. Malik has also served as a Judge of the Lahore High Court in Pakistan from 27 March 2012 to 5 January 2022.

Early life and education 
Ayesha received her basic education from schools in Paris  and New York  and completed her A-Levels at Francis Holland School for Girls in London. In Pakistan, she attended the Karachi Grammar School and earned her Bachelor of Commerce degree  from the Government College of Commerce & Economics, Karachi. She then received her law degree from Pakistan College of Law and her LL.M. from Harvard Law School. Malik was named a London H. Gammon Fellow 1998-1999 for outstanding merit.

Legal career 
Ayesha started her legal career by assisting Mr. Fakhurddin G. Ebrahim at Fakhruddin G. Ebrahim & Co., Karachi from 1997 to 2001.

From 2001 to 2004, Malik worked with Rizvi, Isa, Afridi & Angell, initially as a Senior Associate. From 2004 to 2012, she was a Partner at Rizvi, Isa, Afridi & Angell (RIAA). She was in charge of the Firm's Lahore Office during this time, spearheading the firm's Corporate & Litigation Department.

On 27 March 2012, Ayesha became Justice of the Lahore High Court. 

In January 2019, Ayesha A. Malik became the president of a newly formed Committee for Protection of Women Judges in Lahore, Pakistan. This committee was formed by Chief Justice Lahore High Court to take action against hooliganism by lawyers in district courts” toward female judges.

Ayesha is also a part of The International Association of Women Judges (IAWJ), an initiative of women empowerment through equality and justice for every girl and woman. Justice Ayesha is an advocate of the importance of the gender perspective in upholding the rule of law.

Ayesha's legal practice consists of appearances in the High Courts, District Courts, Banking Court, Special Tribunals and Arbitration Tribunals. In England and Australia, she has been as expert witness in family law cases involving issues of child custody, divorce, women's rights and constitutional protection for women in Pakistan. She has authored several notable judgments with specific reference to the women rights and gender equality.

Ayesha has chaired the Judicial Officers Female Supervisory Committee which looked at all issues related to female judicial officers.

Malik hears the environmental matters in Lahore High Court and is a green judge with advocacy of environmental justice.

She has worked on the process for effectively expediting the litigation process by automation and case management.

In January 2022, she took oath as Justice of Supreme Court of Pakistan. She became first female judge of Supreme Court.

She was honored as one of the BBC 100 Women in December 2022.

Legal educator 
Ayesha has taught Banking Law at the University of Punjab, Department of Masters of Business and Information Technology and Mercantile Law at College of Accounting & Management Sciences, Karachi.

She developed a course on 'gender sensitization for court processes' for Board of the Punjab Judicial Academy. She also compiled a handbook on environmental laws for facilitating the courts on dealing with environmental matters.

Social work 
Ayesha has worked as counsel, pro bono for NGOs involved in poverty alleviation programs, micro finance programs and skills training programs.

She also voluntarily taught English Language and Development in Communication Skills at SOS Herman Gmeiner School in Lahore (an SOS project) for many years.

Publications and writing experience 

 Why 'Trade' in Financial Services: An assessment of the Agreement on Trade in Financial Services under the GATS- The Journal of  World Investment, Vol 1 No.2, December 2000. 12th Edition of the Global Report 2004 on the Independence of the Judiciary-Pakistan Chapter.  Pakistan Secular Laws:
 The Oxford International Encyclopedia of Legal History published by Oxford University Press 2009, Volume 4
 Compilation of the Supreme Court of Pakistan 1956-2006 Selected Cases published by the Pakistan College of Law, published at the 50th anniversary of the Supreme Court of Pakistan.
 Contribution to the Merger Control, Getting The Deal Through, being an International Journal of Competition policy and Regulation Global Competition Review.
 Reporting for Pakistan for the Oxford Reports on International Law in Domestic Courts, a publication of the Oxford University Press.

References

1966 births
Living people
Judges of the Lahore High Court
Pakistani judges
Karachi Grammar School alumni
Harvard Law School alumni
Pakistani women judges
21st-century women judges
Justices of the Supreme Court of Pakistan
BBC 100 Women